This is an alphabetical list of cricketers who played for Yorkshire Diamonds during their existence between 2016 and 2019. They competed in the Women's Cricket Super League, a Twenty20 competition, during these years before being replaced by Northern Diamonds as part of a restructure of English women's domestic cricket.

Players' names are followed by the years in which they were active as a Yorkshire Diamonds player. Seasons given are first and last seasons; the player did not necessarily play in all the intervening seasons. This list only includes players who appeared in at least one match for Yorkshire Diamonds; players who were named in the team's squad for a season but did not play a match are not included.

A
 Hollie Armitage (2016–2019)
 Chamari Atapattu (2017–2018)

B
 Alex Blackwell (2016)
 Thea Brookes (2018)
 Katherine Brunt (2016–2018)
 Stephanie Butler (2016)

D
 Alice Davidson-Richards (2016–2019)
 Gwenan Davies (2018)
 Georgia Davis (2019)
 Sophie Devine (2017)

F
 Helen Fenby (2018–2019)

G
 Katie George (2019)
 Cordelia Griffith (2019)
 Jenny Gunn (2016–2017)

H
 Danielle Hazell (2016)
 Alyssa Healy (2019)
 Bess Heath (2018–2019)

I
 Shabnim Ismail (2016)

K
 Leigh Kasperek (2019)
 Delissa Kimmince (2018)

L
 Beth Langston (2018–2019)
 Katie Levick (2016–2019)
 Suné Luus (2017)

M
 Alice Monaghan (2018)
 Beth Mooney (2016–2018)
 Sophie Munro (2018)

N
 Anna Nicholls (2016–2017)

R
 Jemimah Rodrigues (2019)

S
 Linsey Smith (2019)
 Laura Spragg (2016)

T
 Katie Thompson (2016–2018)

W
 Madeline Walsh (2017)
 Lauren Winfield (2016–2019)

Captains

See also
 List of Northern Diamonds cricketers

References

Yorkshire Diamonds